Petrous portion (From Latin petrous 'rocky') may refer to:

 Petrous portion of the temporal bone
 Petrous portion of the internal carotid artery

Human anatomy